John Rush (born October 23, 1993) is a former Canadian football fullback. He was signed as a free agent on November 30, 2015 by the Blue Bombers after going unselected in the 2015 CFL Draft.

Rush played CIS football at linebacker for the Guelph Gryphons from 2011 to 2015 where he won the Presidents' Trophy in his final year as university football's best defensive player. He attended training camp with the Blue Bombers in 2016, but was part of the team's final cuts that year. Having exhausted his college eligibility, he played for the Canadian Junior Football League's Hamilton Hurricanes in 2016. Following that year focusing on special teams play, he was re-signed by the Blue Bombers on December 13, 2016.

Rush used his COVID-19 vaccination to raise awareness for LGBT+ causes, wearing a full-length bridal gown and fully-styled hair and accessories for the occasion.

References

External links
Official website
Winnipeg Blue Bombers bio

1993 births
Living people
Canadian football fullbacks
Canadian football linebackers
Sportspeople from Niagara Falls, Ontario
Players of Canadian football from Ontario
Guelph Gryphons football players
Canadian Junior Football League players
Winnipeg Blue Bombers players